Stefan Nedović (born 12 January 1988) is a Serbian footballer, who plays for Radnički Kragujevac.

Honours
Radnik Surdulica
Serbian First League: 2014–15

References

External links
 Stefan Nedović Stats at utakmica.rs 
 
 

1988 births
Living people
Sportspeople from Kragujevac
Serbian footballers
FK Radnički 1923 players
FK Šumadija 1903 players
FK Radnik Surdulica players
FK Jagodina players
Serbian First League players
Serbian SuperLiga players
Association football midfielders